Avdal may refer to:
Avdal, Azerbaijan, a village in the Tovuz Rayon
Avdalen, a valley in Norway